is a Japanese anime director. He is best known for directing the first two Digimon series.

Works 
 Aoki Densetsu Shoot! : Episode Director
 Be-Bop High School : Director (ep 3-5)
 Demashita! Powerpuff Girls Z : Director
 Digimon Adventure : Series Director
 Digimon Adventure 02 : Series Director
 Digital Monster X-Evolution : Director
 Digimon Xros Wars : Episode Director (Ep 3, 9)
 Dragon Ball GT  Episode Director & Storyboard Artist (Ep 5, 10)
 Dragon Ball Super Storyboard Artist (Ep 27, 31, 34, 36, 41, 47)
 Gegege no Kitarō  : Episode Director
 Hellsing : Storyboard
 Jigoku Sensei Nube: Production (Ep 27, 32, 38)
 Legendz: New Anime Series : Director
 Magic User's Club: CG Animation (Avant Title)
 Magical Tarurūto-kun: Moero! Yuujou no Mahou Taisen : Director
 Okubyo na Venus (OAV) : Director
 One Piece : Episode Director
 Mega Man: Upon a Star : Storyboard
 Rokudenashi Blues 1993 : Director
 Slam Dunk movie 3 : Director
 Super Robot Wars Original Generation: Divine Wars : Director
 Sugarbunnies : Director
 Transformers: Cybertron : Chief Director
 Yu-Gi-Oh! : Director
 Konjiki no Gash Bell!! : Unit Director

References

External links 
 
 

Anime directors
1959 births
Living people